S. Dwight Slade (February 8, 1849 – February 4, 1931) was a member of the Wisconsin State Assembly.

Biography
Slade was born on February 8, 1849, in Wheatland, Kenosha County, Wisconsin. He later moved to Slades Corners, Wisconsin. He died on February 4, 1931.

Career
Slade was elected to the Assembly in 1898 and was re-elected in 1900 and 1902. Additionally, Chairman of the Wheatland Board of Supervisors from 1883 to 1890. He was a Republican.

References

External links
The Political Graveyard

People from Kenosha County, Wisconsin
Republican Party members of the Wisconsin State Assembly
1849 births
1931 deaths